Intrepid was launched in 1776, almost surely under another name. She appeared as Intrepid in British records from 1787; missing volumes of Lloyd's Register (LR) and missing pages in extant records obscure her earlier name(s) and history. She made one voyage as a whaler in the British southern whale fishery and two as a slave ship in the triangular trade in enslaved people. She also captured a Spanish merchant ship in a notable action. Otherwise she traded widely as a West Indiaman, transport, and to North and South America. She was wrecked in November 1816.

Career
Intrepid first appeared in LR in 1790. However she appeared as Intrepid in British records from 1787 on.

Whaling voyage (1787–1788): Captain John Leard (or Laird) sailed from London on 19 July 1787 bound for the southern fishery. He returned on 27 June 1788 with 56 tuns of whale oil and 14600 seal skins.

Missing volumes and missing pages in extant on-line volumes of LR obscure Intrepids transition from whaling back to trading.

1st slave voyage (1797–1799): Captain Francis Robinson acquired a letter of marque on 16 November 1797. He sailed from Liverpool on 23 December, bound for the Bight of Benin. She gathered slaves at Lagos, and then elsewhere in the Bight. She arrived at Grenada on 3 January 1799 with 235 slaves. She arrived back at Liverpool on 14 June. She had left Liverpool with 47 crew members and suffered seven crew deaths on the voyage. At some point Captain James Leavy replaced Robinson. Intrepid returned to Liverpool from Tobago, via Milford, under the command of Captain Thomas Kidney.

Captain John Pettigrew acquired a letter of marque on 11 May 1801. After a running fight of two hours, Galgo struck. She was armed with twenty-four 6-pounder guns and had a crew of 78 men under the command of Franscisco de Pascadello. The only British casualty was one man killed aboard Intrepid. Galgo was last from Rio de la Plata and on her way to Cadiz with a cargo of hides, cocoa, indigo, and bar copper. The three British ships and their prize arrived at Barbados on 9 July. Lloyd's List described Galgo as having a burthen of 600 tons.

2nd slave voyage (1804–1805): Captain John Campbell acquired a letter of marque on 2 April 1804. He sailed from Liverpool on 4 June. Intrepid acquired her slaves at Calabar. She arrived at Suriname on 3 April 1805 with 312 slaves. She left for home on 20 September, and arrived back at Liverpool on 20 13 November. She had left Liverpool with 67 crew members and she suffered 17 crew deaths on her voyage.

Intrepid, Turnbull, master, was on her way from Demerara to Liverpool when she had to put into Antigua leaky. The next report, from Antigua, was that it was expected that she would be able to proceed on her voyage. A third report stated that Intrepid had had to unload to effect repairs but that she was reloading and was expected to sail with the next convoy. She arrived at Liverpool on 18 June.

Fate
Intrepid, Stroyan, master, arrived at St Johns, Newfoundland on 22 June 1816. She then sailed to Miramichi.

Intrepid ran aground on 16 November on the Hoyle Sandbank, in Liverpool Bay. She was later refloated and taken in to Bootle Bay.

Intrepid then disappeared from the registers and from the ship arrival and departure data in Lloyd's List.

Citations

References
 

1776 ships
Age of Sail merchant ships of England
Whaling ships
Liverpool slave ships
Maritime incidents in 1816